The 2009 WCHA Men's Ice Hockey Tournament was an American college ice hockey tournament in 2009 played between March 13 and March 21, at five conference arenas and the Xcel Energy Center in St. Paul, Minnesota. Minnesota-Duluth won their third WCHA Men's Ice Hockey Tournament and the Broadmoor Trophy and received the Western Collegiate Hockey Association's automatic bid to the 2009 NCAA Division I Men's Ice Hockey Tournament.

Format
The first round of the postseason tournament featured a best-of-three games format. All ten conference teams participated in the tournament. Teams were seeded No. 1 through No. 10 according to their final conference standing, with a tiebreaker system used to seed teams with an identical number of points accumulated. The top five seeded teams each earned home ice and host one of the lower seeded teams.

The winners of the first round series advanced to the Xcel Energy Center for the WCHA Final Five, the collective name for the quarterfinal, semifinal, and championship rounds. The Final Five used a single-elimination format. Teams were re-seeded No. 1 through No. 5 according to the final regular season conference standings, with the top three teams automatically advancing to the semifinals.

Conference standings
Note: GP = Games played; W = Wins; L = Losses; T = Ties; PTS = Points; GF = Goals For; GA = Goals Against

Tiebreakers
Wisconsin and Colorado College each finished the regular season with 31 points. Wisconsin won the tiebreaker, having the better head-to-head record of the two teams.

Bracket
Teams are reseeded after the first round

First round

(1) North Dakota vs. (10) Michigan Tech

(2) Denver vs. (9) Alaska-Anchorage

(3) Wisconsin vs. (8) Minnesota State

(4) Colorado College vs. (7) Minnesota-Duluth

(5) Minnesota vs. (6) St. Cloud State

Quarterfinal

(4) Minnesota vs. (5) Minnesota-Duluth

Semifinals

(1) North Dakota vs. (5) Minnesota-Duluth

(2) Denver vs. (3) Wisconsin

Third place

(1) North Dakota vs. (3) Wisconsin

Championship

(2) Denver vs. (5) Minnesota-Duluth

Tournament awards

All-Tournament Team
F Mike Connolly (Minnesota-Duluth)
F Jordy Murray (Wisconsin)
F MacGregor Sharp (Minnesota-Duluth)
D Josh Meyers (Minnesota-Duluth)
D Patrick Wiercioch (Denver)
G Alex Stalock* (Minnesota-Duluth)
* Most Valuable Player(s)

References

External links
2009 WCHA Men's Ice Hockey Tournament

WCHA Men's Ice Hockey Tournament
WCHA Men's Ice Hockey Tournament